Kandalla Balagopal (10 June 1952 – 8 October 2009) was a human rights activist, mathematician and lawyer who was known for his work on the issue of civil liberties and human rights. He was a staunch civil liberties activist in Andhra Pradesh. He had broken away from the Andhra Pradesh Civil Liberties Committee (APCLC), with which he was associated since its inception in ‘80's, on the issue of violence perpetrated by the erstwhile CPI-ML Peoples War. He was a writer on people's issues and had recently written about the developments on the Maoist front in west Bengal.

Early life

Balagopal was the fifth child of eight children of a middle class Telugu Brahmin couple- Kandalla Parthanatha Sarma and Rallapalli Nagamani. One of his brothers, Anantha, was a doctor in the Indian army. His father's job in the insurance sector entailed frequent transfers and Balagopal's education was in several towns of AP, from Nellore to Vizianagaram. After Pre-University education in Kavali and BSc in Tirupati, he took an MSc and PhD in mathematics from the Regional Engineering College in Warangal before proceeding to Delhi for a post-doctoral at the Indian Statistical Institute. He returned to Warangal in 1981, where he started teaching Maths at the Kakatiya University. This was also the time when he decided on social activism and joined the Andhra Pradesh Civil Liberties Committee.

Career
Balagopal was a mathematician, he began his career as a teacher in Warangal but soon turned full-time human rights activist. He was a Mathematics professor at Kakatiya University before quitting in 1985. He did his Phd in Kakatiya University. He chose to become a lawyer much later, after getting fully associated with the human rights movement.

Balagopal served as the general secretary of Andhra Pradesh Civil Liberties Committee (APCLC) between 1983 and 1997. Following differences of opinion within the APCLC on how to respond to revolutionary violence he left APCLC and formed the Human Rights Forum.

Over a period of 26 years, he documented and took up cases of thousands of extrajudicial killings by government forces in Andhra Pradesh and elsewhere. During a series of kidnapping committed by the Maoists in the late 1980s, the vigilante organisation Praja Bandhu abducted him and demanded that two police officers be released from naxalite custody. The organisation, which was suspected to have ties with the state police, released him only after the abducted policemen were returned.

First introduced to Marxism through reading DD Kosambi, K. Balagopal followed a dialectical Marxist method in scores of articles published in the Economic and Political Weekly until the early 90s. Deeply disturbed by the collapse of the Soviet Union, Balagopal began to explore humanist traditions in Marxism for answers. His articles in the 90s reflect this shift.

Human Rights Forum
Balagopal founded the Human Rights Forum in Andhra Pradesh.

His public criticism of the acts of violence by Maoists attracted severe criticism from the naxalites. Following his comments on the violence in Lalgarh in West Bengal, Maoist Central Committee member, Mallojula Koteshwar Rao had challenged Balagopal to visit Lalgarh resistance area to know the real picture.

He served as a member of the Expert Group on Development Challenges in Extremist Affected Areas, set up by Planning Commission of India in 2008. He believed that human rights are indivisible. He was known for his simple living and his analytical articles that appeared regularly in Economic and Political Weekly.His articles in EPW included issues ranging from the regime of Indira Gandhi, Reservations issue, human rights violations from time to time in different places, the Gujarat riots, Special Economic Zones, land acquisition, sub-categorisation of Scheduled Castes in Andhra Pradesh, the failure of talks between the YSR Government and the CPI-Maoists and so on.

His Telugu essay 'Cheekati Konaalu'directly questioned the violation of human rights by those who claimed that they were working for a radical revolution. After the formation of Human Rights Forum, he expanded his activities and visited areas undergoing intense social turmoil in Jammu and Kashmir, Gujarat, West Bengal and Orissa. In Orissa his fact-finding teams visited Rayagada district and documented the perspective of people displaced by Utkal Allumina Project, Jagatsinghpur district in respect of people affected by proposed Posco steel plant and Kandhamal district, which was affected by communal and ethnic clashes in 2007/2008. He analysed and exposed the hypocrisy in the functioning of most of the mainstream political parties.

Balagopal started practicing law nearly a decade ago and has argued dozens of cases pertaining to encounter killings by the police.

He died in Hyderabad on 8 October 2009.

Personal life
Balagopal was married to Vasanta Lakshmi, a journalist currently working in Andhra Jyothy newspaper. They have a son, Rigobertha Prabhatha.

Legacy
Ramachandra Guha praised Balagopal for his non-partisan commitment to human rights.

References

External links

Obituaries
 Remembering K Balagopal: www.balagopal.org

20th-century Indian lawyers
2009 deaths
1952 births
Indian human rights activists
People from Bellary
Activists from Karnataka
Telugu people